Bakari Fofana (born December 20, 1962 in Bamako, Mali) is a former footballer who played as an attacker.

External links
Bakari Fofana profile at Chamois FC 79

1962 births
Living people
Malian footballers
Association football forwards
Chamois Niortais F.C. players
Ligue 2 players
Sportspeople from Bamako
21st-century Malian people